Hans Helwig  (25 September 1881 – 24 August 1952) was a German Nazi Party politician, World War I veteran, Schutzstaffel general and Nazi concentration camp commandant. An early member of the Nazi movement he fulfilled a number of roles within Nazism down the years. He was born and died in Hemsbach.

Military service
The son of a forest ranger and the youngest of 15 children Helwig apprenticed as a bricklayer in his home village of Hemsbach. Discontented with life as a bricklayer the 19-year-old Helwig enlisted in the German Imperial Army. He rose to the rank of master sergeant in an infantry regiment before leaving in early 1914 to work as a court clerk. Helwig was only a few months out of the army when World War I broke out, prompting him to re-enlist. Returning to the same battalion Helwig saw action on both the Western and Eastern Fronts.

Joining the Nazi Party
Helwig returned to his post with the court before eventually moving on to a role as a minor official at the German Ministry of Justice. Although his personal position was largely untouched, Helwig nonetheless became deeply resentful of the situation in his native Baden which was under French occupation and was invaded and re-occupied by France and Belgium in 1923. An admirer of Adolf Hitler from early, his beliefs caused him trouble professionally and he was suspended from his job following the Beer Hall putsch, which he had been heard to praise at work. By this time Helwig was already officially a member of the Sturmabteilung, having initially joined the Deutschvölkischer Schutz und Trutzbund after the war.

Suspended from work, Helwig was able to devote more of his time to the SA and the Nazi Party. A founder of the local branch of the reorganised Nazi Party in 1925, he was elected a city councilman not long after. At the time in Baden Nazi politics were dominated by a personality clash between local strongmen Heinrich Himmler and Robert Heinrich Wagner, a struggle in which Helwig eventually sided with Himmler, leaving the SA for the SS in 1929. Already 48 and generally considered to be of low intelligence it was unclear what use he could be to the SS but nonetheless he was received enthusiastically both due to his friendship with Himmler and the fact that he had put loyalty to the Nazi Party above his own finances by getting suspended from work due to his Nazism.

Political career
Helwig initially followed a career in Nazi politics, following a personal endorsement to Adolf Hitler from Himmler. In the July 1932 election he was returned as a delegate to the Reichstag although there is no record of him accomplishing anything during his brief spell in the institution. In the meantime his old rival Wagner had re-established his control of Baden, Himmler having long since departed to serve as Reichsführer-SS, and ensured that Helwig would not be a candidate in the November 1932 election, instead ensuring his demotion to the Landtag der Republik Baden, a body that was abolished following the Nazi takeover.

Camp commandant
On account of his long military service he initially served the SS as voluntary commander of a battalion and then a regiment. Following the Nazi takeover he was then appointed a governor of Bruchsal prison, a role that he did not last long in due to the mentally taxing nature of the work. Following a nervous breakdown he retired from SS duty but was dismayed to find his pension only stretched to 202 Marks a month. Helwig recovered from his health issues rapidly and sought to return to the SS. He was readmitted reluctantly, largely on the basis of his long service (which entitled him to the Golden Nazi Party Badge) and loyalty.

By this time it was unclear what role Helwig could possibly fill in the SS and a superior officer had written a personal letter to Himmler to this effect. Within the letter it was suggested that his prison experience might make it possible for him to command a concentration camp and Himmler acted on this suggestion, and made him commandant of the women's camp at Lichtenburg. In July 1937 he succeeded Karl Otto Koch as commandant of Sachsenhausen concentration camp and was soon being put forward as a candidate for promotion by Theodor Eicke, who had initially been reluctant to have Helwig as one of his men. However Helwig did blot his copybook when it was discovered that he boasted of his atrocities at Sachsenhausen to a group of non-Germans after getting drunk in a bar, breaking protocol about keeping concentration camp activities quiet. Indeed, as was the case for all of the commandants at Sachsenhausen, Helwig's command was noted for its viciousness.

Helwig lost his position the following year over a somewhat pedantic clash between the SS hierarchy and Justice Minister Franz Gürtner over a failure to obey protocol. An inmate of Sachsenhausen, Johannes Winiarz, was given a forced vasectomy at the camp but it emerged that the operation had not been approved by a judge and Winiarz had had no chance to appeal, both of which were laid down as essential in such cases. Himmler put the blame on Eicke who in turn argued that it had been Helwig who had mixed up the orders, having become confused by a sudden influx of new prisoners at the time. Eicke told Himmler that the 57-year-old Helwig was "totally decrepit ... both mentally and physically" and recommended he be removed as commandant. He was replaced by Hermann Baranowski soon afterwards.

Later years
Helwig appealed to be allowed to continue but neither Eicke nor Himmler would be moved. Given a 5000 Mark severance in order to convince him to leave he returned to Hemsbach. His standing as a party loyalist ensured that the SS continued to help him find employment and after a few failed attempts he found a role in the Organisation Todt that suited his talents. Based on the Eastern Front, he oversaw the building of a fuel camp that also doubled as a place to hold Soviet prisoners of war. The veteran, who by this time was a Brigadeführer in the SS despite having previously been described by Eicke as not officer material, finished the war as the liaison officer between the northern command of the Wehrmacht and Himmler's HQ.

Helwig, who remained an active member of his local Protestant church in Hemsbach throughout his SS career despite the faith being officially discouraged, died in his hometown in 1952 before any legal proceedings could be brought against him.

Ranks and promotions

References

1881 births
1952 deaths
People from Rhein-Neckar-Kreis
People from the Grand Duchy of Baden
Nazi Party politicians
German Army personnel of World War I
Sturmabteilung personnel
SS-Brigadeführer
Sachsenhausen concentration camp personnel
Members of the Reichstag of the Weimar Republic
Nazi concentration camp commandants
Lichtenburg concentration camp personnel